Novia is a Spanish word that means "girlfriend" (novio means "boyfriend"). It may also refer to:

Jimenez Novia, a supercar built only in a single model in 1995 by Jimenez, a French maker 
La Novia, a 1961 Argentine film starring Elsa Daniel 
Mi Novia, a painting by award-winning Filipino painter and hero Juan Luna
 Novia gens, an ancient Roman family